Swabia is one of the seven administrative regions of Bavaria, Germany. It consists of ten districts and 340 municipalities (including four cities).

Governance 
The county of Swabia is located in southwest Bavaria. It was annexed by Bavaria in 1803, is part of the historic region of Swabia and was formerly ruled by dukes of the Hohenstaufen dynasty. During the Nazi period, the area was separated from the rest of Bavaria to become the Gau Swabia. It was re-incorporated into Bavaria after the war.

The Regierungsbezirk is subdivided into 3 regions (Planungsregionen): Allgäu, Augsburg, and Donau-Iller. Donau-Iller also includes two districts and one city of Baden-Württemberg.

* Part of the Swabian Keuper Land

Districts and district-free towns before the regional reorganization in 1972

Population 
Historical population of Swabia:
1939: 934,311
1950: 1,293,734
1961: 1,340,217
1970: 1,467,454
1987: 1,546,504
2002: 1,776,465
2005: 1,788,919
2006: 1,786,764
2008: 1,787,995
2010: 1,785,875
2015: 1,846,020
2019: 1,899,442

Economy 
The Gross domestic product (GDP) of the region was € 74.8 billion in 2018, accounting for 2.2% of German economic output. GDP per capita adjusted for purchasing power was € 36,500 or 121% of the EU27 average in the same year. The GDP per employee was 101% of the EU average.

History 

The Bavarian administrative region of Swabia is the eastern part of the Duchy of Swabia. After the execution of the Swabian duke Conradin in Naples in 1268, his uncle, the Bavarian duke Louis inherited some of Conradin's possessions in Swabia. In 1803, with the German Mediatisation, Bavaria acquired the further East Swabian territories, which were merged with Palatinate-Neuburg.

After the founding of the Kingdom of Bavaria, the state was totally reorganised and, in 1808, divided into 15 administrative districts, in Bavaria called . They were created in the fashion of the French departements, quite even in size and population, and named after their main rivers. 

In the following years, due to territorial changes (e.g. the loss of Tyrol, the addition of the Palatinate), the number of districts was reduced to 8. The Swabian territories were merged with Palatinate-Neuburg and the new district was called  (Upper Danube District). In 1837, king Ludwig I of Bavaria renamed all the districts after historical territorial names and tribes of the area. This also involved some border changes or territorial swaps. Thus the name  changed to Swabia.

In 1945, the town of Lindau was divested by France, but reunited with the district of Swabia in 1955. In 1972, the former Swabian city Neuburg an der Donau was reunited with the district of Upper Bavaria.

Main sites 

Next to the capital Augsburg and several other old cities including Donauwörth, Nördlingen, Memmingen, Mindelheim, Kaufbeuren and Kempten, the Ottobeuren Abbey and the scenic attractions of the River Danube in the north and the Allgäu in the south with the Allgäu Alps and Oberstdorf and the royal castles of Hohenschwangau and Neuschwanstein next to Füssen belong to the major attractions. With the district of Lindau, Bavarian Swabia has access to Lake Constance.

Food and drink 
Swabian cuisine is down-to-earth and rather simple. Noodle products are very important.
 Brenntar
 Spätzle
 Maultaschen
 Bergkäse
 Schupfnudel
 Alb-Leisa

Notable people
 Michael Bredl (1916–1999), a singer and collector of traditional Swabian Volksmusik
 Ludwig Aurbacher (1784–1847), famous for his stories about The Seven Swabians
 Ludwig Ganghofer (1855-1920), writer and inventor
 Sebastian Kneipp (1821-1897), inventor of Kneipp-Kur known as Water-Doctor of Hydrotherapy

See also
 Swabian Keuper-Lias Plains

References

External links
Official website

 
Swabia
NUTS 2 statistical regions of the European Union
History of Swabia
Government regions of Germany